Lanark is a city in Carroll County, Illinois, United States. The population was 1,504 at the 2020 census, down from 1,584 at the 2010 census. The city was named after Lanark, in Scotland.

History
Under the auspices of the Chicago, Milwaukee, St. Paul and Pacific Railroad (Milwaukee Road), Daniel W. Dame purchased , laid out the city of Lanark, and was elected its first mayor in 1861. In 1886, 40 residents each donated one dollar to form a public library, and a primary and secondary school was completed in August 1871. On November 25, 1893, the original school was destroyed by fire.

Early in the Twentieth Century, Lanark was home to the Cotta steam car company.

In 1986 Lanark High School was consolidated with nearby Shannon High School to form the Eastland School District. The high school and grade school were originally located in Lanark, with the middle school in Shannon. After the end of the 2012–2013 school year, the Eastland School Board made the decision to close the Elementary building in Lanark, and move those students to the Shannon building. The Middle School students were then relocated to the High School building in Lanark, now known as the Eastland Jr/Sr High School.

Demographics

As of the 2020 census there were 1,504 people, 617 households, and 433 families residing in the city. The racial makeup of the city was 93.88% White, 0.60% African American, 0.13% Native American, 0.53% Asian, 1.20% from other races, and 3.66% from two or more races. Hispanic or Latino of any race were 2.53% of the population.

There were 617 households, out of which 49.11% had children under the age of 18 living with them, 51.38% were married couples living together, 14.59% had a female householder with no husband present, and 29.82% were non-families. 25.45% of all households were made up of individuals, and 17.18% had someone living alone who was 65 years of age or older. The average household size was 2.77 and the average family size was 2.32.

The city's age distribution consisted of 22.4% under the age of 18, 7.8% from 18 to 24, 21.7% from 25 to 44, 24.6% from 45 to 64, and 23.4% who were 65 years of age or older. The median age was 43.9 years. For every 100 females, there were 96.4 males. For every 100 females age 18 and over, there were 94.5 males.

The median income for a household in the city was $47,917, and the median income for a family was $77,614. Males had a median income of $41,146 versus $23,354 for females. The per capita income for the city was $29,028. About 11.3% of families and 15.5% of the population were below the poverty line, including 22.7% of those under age 18 and 6.5% of those age 65 or over.

Geography

Lanark is located at  (42.101346, -89.832120).

Climate

Education
Lanark is a part of Eastland Community Unit School District #308, which also includes Shannon and Lake Carroll.
Lanark, Shannon and Lake Carroll are the home of the Eastland Cougars. Eastland Elementary School, is located in Shannon and Eastland Jr./Sr. High School, is located in Lanark.

References

External links
City of Lanark Homepage
Lanark Chamber of Commerce
Eastland School District

Cities in Carroll County, Illinois
Cities in Illinois
Populated places established in 1861
1861 establishments in Illinois